Anterior border may refer to:
 Anterior margin of pancreas
 Anterior border of lung